The Wildwood Subdivision is a railroad line owned by CSX Transportation in Florida. It runs along CSX's S Line from Baldwin south to Zephyrhills via Ocala and Wildwood for a total of 155.7 miles.  The S Line is CSX's designation for the line that was the Seaboard Air Line Railroad main line from 1903 to 1967.

The north end of the line is at Baldwin Junction, where it connects with the Jacksonville Terminal Subdivision to the east, the Callahan Subdivision to the north, and the Florida Gulf & Atlantic Railroad to the west.  At its south end, it connects to the Yeoman Subdivision, which continues to Tampa.  It also connects with the Vitis Subdivision just south of Dade City

Operation

The Wildwood Subdivision and the Yeoman Subdivision (which both run along CSX’s S Line) together are CSX’s main freight route through Peninsular Florida.  The Wildwood Subdivision is used exclusively for freight.  Freight trains bound for Tampa generally run the full line to the Yeoman Subdivision while trains to Miami, Orlando, and other areas of Southern Florida diverge on to the Vitis Subdivision at Vitis Junction. 

The line is double tracked in many places to accommodate the large amount of freight traffic and is dispatched through a Centralized traffic control signal system.  Some of the double track was installed in the mid 2010s to further increase capacity since through trains no longer use the adjacent A Line, which is now partially state owned.

Passenger service previously operated over the line which diminished in the late 1980s when CSX abandoned parts of Seaboard's branch at Wildwood to West Palm Beach and Miami (the Florida Western and Northern Railroad).  Amtrak's Silver Star to Miami used this route up until then, which was subsequently shifted to the A Line through Orlando. Passenger service was discontinued completely in 2004 when Amtrak truncated the Palmetto to Savannah, Georgia.

Wildwood Yard
A notable location on the Wildwood Subdivision is Wildwood Yard.  Today, Wildwood yard serves as a small CSX maintenance and switching yard.  It was historically a busy classification yard in the days of the Seaboard Air Line Railroad.  From the 1920s to the 1980s, the yard was significant since the Seaboard's division points to Tampa, Orlando, and Miami were located just to the south.  Trains to Orlando previously turned towards Leesburg and Tavares just south of the yard (the wye at the south end of the yard is all that remains of that connection).  Trains to Miami turned in Coleman down Seaboard's Florida Western and Northern Railroad.

Wildwood station still stands and is co-located in the yard, though passenger service has long been discontinued.  In 2013, new double-tracked main lines were built to bypass the yard.  The station's platforms were removed to accommodate this expansion.

History

Baldwin to Owensboro

The Wildwood Subdivision from Baldwin to Waldo was built in 1859 by the Florida Railroad, which historically ran from Fernandina Beach to Cedar Key (which was the first cross-state railroad route in Florida). From Waldo south to Ocala the line was originally part of the Peninsula Railroad and from Ocala south to Lacoochee (at a point previously known as Owensboro Junction) it was part of the Tropical Florida Railroad.  All three of these railroads would be merged into the Florida Central and Peninsular Railroad, which would be bought by the Seaboard Air Line Railroad in 1903.  The line became the Seaboard's main line.  For much of the Seaboard Air Line era, the main line was designated from Jacksonville and Baldwin to Wildwood as the  Baldwin Subdivision.  From Wildwood to Coleman, it was part of the Miami Subdivision, which continued down the now-abandoned branch from Coleman to Auburndale and to the Miami area (built by the Seaboard's Florida Western and Northern Railroad subsidiary).  From Coleman south, the Seaboard main line was designated as the Tampa Subdivision.

Owensboro to Zephyrhills

From Owensboro south to Vitis Junction, the Wildwood Subdivision was originally part of the South Florida Railroad's Pemberton Ferry Branch, which would become the Atlantic Coast Line Railroad's DuPont—Lakeland Line.  From Vitis Junction south to Zephyrhills, the Wildwood Subdivision was the Atlantic Coast Line's Vitis—Tampa Line.

Merger and consolidation
The Seaboard line originally had its own alignment from Owensboro to Zephyrhills via Dade City, but that segment was abandoned in the early 1970s, shortly after the Seaboard Air Line's 1967 merger with the Atlantic Coast Line Railroad.  The abandonment was part of an effort to consolidate the merged network, which was named the Seaboard Coast Line Railroad.  The Atlantic Coast Line route was kept in favor of the Seaboard route since is it went around the downtowns of Dade City and Zephyrhills.  Despite its Atlantic Coast Line heritage, it is unofficially considered part of the S Line since it carries all S Line traffic (though, this segment still retains its ACL milepost numbering with AR and ARF prefixes).

A portion of the former SAL line in Dade City became the Hardy Trail in 2019.

After the merger, the line remained the Baldwin and Miami Subdivisions north of Coleman, but the remaining line from Coleman to Owensboro became the Coleman Subdivision.  The ex-ACL segments were then part of the West Coast Subdivision.

In 1980, the Seaboard Coast Line's parent company merged with the Chessie System, creating the CSX Corporation.  The CSX Corporation initially operated the Chessie and Seaboard Systems separately until 1986, when they were merged into CSX Transportation.  The line was renamed the Wildwood Subdivision from Baldwin and Zephyrhills by CSX after more of the West Coast Subdivision was abandoned in 1987.  The Wildwood Subdivision and the rest of the S Line (CSX's designation for the former Seaboard Air Line main line) continues to be CSX's main route through peninsular Florida.

See also
 List of CSX Transportation lines

References

CSX Transportation lines
Rail infrastructure in Florida
Seaboard Air Line Railroad
Atlantic Coast Line Railroad
Transportation in Pasco County, Florida
Transportation in Hernando County, Florida
Transportation in Sumter County, Florida
Transportation in Marion County, Florida
Transportation in Alachua County, Florida
Transportation in Bradford County, Florida
Transportation in Duval County, Florida
Transportation in Nassau County, Florida